Tillandsia mallemontii is a species in the genus Tillandsia. This species is native to Brazil.

Cultivars
 Tillandsia 'Blue Moon'
 Tillandsia 'Kia Ora'
 Tillandsia 'Nezley'
 Tillandsia 'Van Der Mollis'
 Tillandsia 'Wo'

References

BSI Cultivar Registry Retrieved 11 October 2009

mallemontii
Flora of Brazil